Ghadge & Suun is an Indian Marathi television drama which was aired on Colors Marathi. It starred Bhagyashree Limaye, Chinmay Udgirkar, Sukanya Kulkarni in lead roles.

Plot 
Amruta is married into the traditional Ghadge family, the most renowned jewellers (Ghadge & Sons) in Thane. Amruta, a cheerful girl of contemporary thoughts is keen to make her career in gemmology and believes that men and women are equals. Sadhana (Mai) Ghadge, the matriarch of the Ghadge family, is admired as well as feared by the family members. Mai is a stickler for discipline and believes in women essaying their roles in the kitchen and home. It explores Amruta's relationship with Mai and her efforts to win the hearts of all the Ghadges.

Cast

Main
 Bhagyashree Limaye as Amruta Akshay Ghadge (nee Prabhune): Akshay's wife, Mai's youngest granddaughter-in-law, Devdatta and Mrudula's daughter-in-law.
 Chinmay Udgirkar as Akshay Ghadge: Amruta's husband, Devdatta and Mrudula's son, Kiara's ex-boyfriend.
 Sukanya Kulkarni as Sadhana Ghadge (Mai): Akshay, Anant and Sharmishtha's paternal grandmother.

Recurring
 Richa Agnihotri as Kiara Sawant: Akshay's girlfriend
 Pratiksha Mungekar replaced Richa as Kiara Sawant
 Atisha Naik as Vasudha Dinkar Ghadge: Akshay's paternal aunt; Mai's eldest daughter-in-law; Anant and Sharmishtha's mother; Bhagyashri's mother-in-law.
 Uday Salvi as Dinkar Ghadge: Vasudha's husband; Anant and Sharmishtha's father; Bhagyashri's father-in-law; Akshay's paternal uncle; Purushottam and Sadhana's elder son.
 Sandip Gaikwad as Anant Ghadge: Vasudha and Dinkar's son; Sharmishtha's real brother; Bhagyashri's widower; Chitra's husband; Akshay's cousin.
 Sonal Pawar as Chitra Ghadge: Anant's second wife, Vasudha and Dinkar's second daughter-in-law.
 Uday Sabnis as Manohar Prabhune: Amruta's greedy uncle.
 Mahesh Joshi as Devdatta Ghadge: Akshay's father; Purushottam and Sadhna's younger son; Mrudula's husband.
 Manjusha Godse as Mrudula Ghadge: Akshay's mother; Devdatta's wife; Mai's younger daughter-in-law.
 Prajakta Kelkar replaced Manjusha as Mrudula Ghadge
 Swati Limaye as Bhagyashri Ghadge: Anant's wife, Vasudha and Dinkar's daughter-in-law.
 Mayuri Kapadane as Sharmishtha Ghadge: Anant's sister; Dinkar and Vasudha's daughter; Akshay's cousin.
 Prafulla Samant as Purushottam Ghadge (Anna): Sadhana's husband, Devdatta and Dinkar's father, Akshay, Anant, Sharmishtha's grandfather.
 Usha Nadkarni as Aau: Purushottam's mother; Sadhna's mother-in-law, Devdatta and Dinkar's grandmother; Akshay, Anant and Sharmishtha's great grandmother.

Guest appearance
 Rishi Saxena as Rishi, Amruta's old friend.
 Harshada Khanvilkar as Inspector Saudamini.

Production

Casting 
Bhagyashree Limaye was selected to play the role of Amruta, making her acting debut. Chinmay Udgirkar was selected to play the role of Akshay. Richa Agnihotri was initially roped for the role of Kiara, but was replaced by Pratiksha Mungekar. Rishi Saxena also play the role of Amruta's friend. Harshada Khanvilkar roped for the role of Saudamini, a police officer. Usha Nadkarni also selected to play the role of Aau. Sonal Pawar was selected to play the role of Chitra.

Adaptations

References

External links 
 
 Ghadge & Suun on Voot

Marathi-language television shows
2017 Indian television series debuts
Colors Marathi original programming